The following is a list of World War II documentary films.

1940s

1950s

1960s

1970s

1980s

1990s

2000s

2010s

2020s

See also 
List of Allied propaganda films of World War II
List of World War II films
List of World War II TV series
List of World War II short films
List of Holocaust films

Documentary
 
 
World War II
World War II